Josiah Quincy VI (October 15, 1859 – September 8, 1919) was an American politician from Massachusetts who served as mayor of Boston from 1896 to 1900. His grandfather Josiah Quincy IV  (known as Josiah Quincy Jr.) and great-grandfather Josiah Quincy III also had served as mayors of Boston.

Biography
Quincy was born in Quincy, Massachusetts, on October 15, 1859, and pursued a career as a lawyer. A Democrat, he was a member of Massachusetts House of Representatives from 1887 to 1888 and from 1890 to 1891.

Quincy was an unsuccessful candidate for U.S. Representative from the 2nd District of Massachusetts in 1888 and served as the Massachusetts Democratic state chairman from 1891 to 1894 and in 1905 to 1906. He was appointed United States Assistant Secretary of State by President Grover Cleveland in 1893, but resigned after six months.  

Quincy served two terms as mayor of Boston, being elected in December 1895, re-elected in December 1897, and holding office from January 1896 to January 1900. He was an unsuccessful candidate for governor of Massachusetts in 1901, and a delegate to the Massachusetts constitutional convention in 1917. Quincy was an unsuccessful candidate for Massachusetts attorney general in 1917. He was a member of the Massachusetts Society of Colonial Wars. 

Quincy died on September 8, 1919 at age 59.

See also
Timeline of Boston, 1890s

References

Further reading

External links
Quincy election records at ourcampaigns.com
Political Graveyard information on Josiah Quincy (1859-1919)

1859 births
1919 deaths
Mayors of Boston
United States Assistant Secretaries of State
Politicians from Quincy, Massachusetts
Phillips family (New England)
Quincy family
Harvard College alumni